Gudding is a surname. Notable people with the surname include:

Gabriel Gudding (born 1966), American poet, essayist, and translator
Gerd Gudding (1951–2015), Norwegian fiddler, bass guitarist, and singer